Manav Gohil (born 9 November 1974) is an Indian actor. He has been active in the Hindi film industry for more than a decade and is best known for his roles in Hindi television shows, including the soap opera Kahaani Ghar Ghar Kii, the dance reality show Nach Baliye 2, the crime drama C.I.D., the drama Shaadi Mubarak, and Tenali Rama.

Career
After graduation Manav Gohil decided to join the entertainment industry. He has acted in many popular shows such as Kahaani Ghar Ghar Kii, Kasautii Zindagii Kay, Kkusum, Agle Janam Mohe Bitiya Hi Kijo and The Buddy Project. He also co-hosted the TV show Fame Gurukul with Mandira Bedi.

Besides working in television series, Gohil had a lead role in the Gujrati film Saptapadii, which also starred Swaroop Sampat.

Gohil also acted in plays including Kennedy Bridge by Khalid Mohammed and Lady from the Ocean by Illa Arun. He has made endorsements for brands including Honda Amaze, Volkswagen, ICICI and Mahindra etc.

Gohil has played Yamraja in Yam Hain Hum on SAB TV, King Krishnadevaraya in Tenali Rama on SAB TV and Hanumant Singh in Kesari Nandan on Colors TV.
 
In August 2020, Gohil started to play the male lead role of Keertan Tibrewal, a.k.a. K.T., in Star Plus's television series Shaadi Mubarak.

Personal life
He was born in Surendranagar in Gujarat, and moved to Vadodara for his education. He completed Bachelor in Commerce and then MBA from Vadodara. He is married to TV actress Shweta Kawatra. They participated in the dance competition show Nach Baliye 2 where Manav was awarded best dancer by Saroj Khan. The couple became parents to a daughter on 11 May 2012. The couple follows Nichiren Buddhism.

Filmography
 Chori Chori (2003)
 Saptapadii (2013) – as Siddharth Sanghvi
 Love Yoou Soniye (2013) – as Parminder (cameo)
 Dhantya Open (2017) – as Prakash Shah
 Super 30 (2019) – as Purushottam
 Baaghi 3 (2020) – as Asif
 Tribhanga (2021) – as Raghav

Television

References

External links

 
 
 

1974 births
Indian male television actors
Living people
Nichiren Buddhists
Indian Buddhists
21st-century Buddhists
Participants in Indian reality television series
Reality dancing competition contestants
People from Surendranagar district
People from Vadodara